Light Up the Dark is the second studio album by English singer-songwriter Gabrielle Aplin, which was released by Parlophone Records on 18 September 2015. The album peaked at number fourteen in the UK Albums Chart.

Singles
"Light Up the Dark" was the album's first single and the music video was released on 18 May 2015. The second single was "Sweet Nothing" which was released on 6 August 2015.

Track listing

Personnel
Musicians
Gabrielle Aplin – vocals, piano, Hammond organ, pipe organ, Juno, electric guitar, acoustic guitar, flute
Adam Argyle – guitar, harpsichord, piano, background vocals
Nick Atkinson – guitar, background vocals
Karl Brazil – stick
Richard Causon – harmonium, Hammond organ
Adam Falkner – drums, percussion
Hannah Grace – screams, background vocals
Tim Harries – double bass
Jimmy Hogarth – bass, drums, guitar, keyboards, percussion, programming
Edd Holloway – keyboards
Alfie Hudson-Taylor – background vocals
Harry Hudson-Taylor – background vocals
Cass Lowe – piano
Charlotte O'Connor – background vocals
Luke Potashnick – bass, Casio, acoustic guitar, electric guitar, Juno, Mellotron, Moog bass, percussion, Space Echo guitar, string samples, synthesizer, background vocals
Matt Prime – bass, guitar, piano
Sacha Skarbeck – piano, background vocals
Nikolaj Torp Larsen – glockenspiel, Juno, Moog bass, Hammond organ, piano, Wurlitzer
Tadhg Walsh-Peelo – string section
Tom Wilding – baritone, bass, drums, flugelhorn, electric guitar, percussion, piano, trombone, trumpet, background vocals
Damon Wilson – bongos, cymbals, drums

Production
Greg Calbi – mastering
Adam Cole – engineer
Eduardo De La Paz – mixing, mixing assistant
Steve Fallone – mastering
Edd Holloway – producer
Sam Miller – vocal engineer
Luke Potashnick – producer
Matt Prime – producer
Gabrielle Aplin – liner notes

Charts

References

2015 albums
Gabrielle Aplin albums
Parlophone albums